ReCivitas Institute is a Brazilian NPO as crowd-funded unconditional basic income pilot project in Quatinga Velho, Brazil. The project paid 30 reals a month to around a hundred members of the community for five years(2008 to 2014). In January 2016, ReCivitas launched a “Lifetime Basic Income” in the Brazilian village of Quatinga Velho, a project it hopes will serve as a model to other organizations. This new project Basic Income Startup which intends to make these payments permanent. As of January 16, 14 residents of Quatinga Velho have basic incomes, now set at an amount of 40 Reais, that they will retain for at least 20 years.

The directors of ReCivitas, Bruna Augusto Pereira and Marcus Brancaglione have also published several papers  and books on the results of pilot projects. And made several speeches in Congresses, Initiatives, Universities, and Forums  around the World advocating for a Universal Basic Income and experimental models like Quatinga Velho.

See also
 Quatinga Velho
 Basic income pilots
 List of basic income models
 Basic Income in Brazil
 Basic Income

Bibliography
Baert, Anthony. Experiências de transferência de renda universal. U.Catholique de Louvain. 2011
Dill, Alexander. Local Commons in rural São Paulo. Basel Institute of Commons and Economics, 2011.
Krozer, Alice. A regional Basic Income: towards the eradication of extreme poverty in Central America. ECLAC, United Nations, 2010.
Pereira, B., & dos Santos, M. V. (2011a). Renda básica garantida no terceiro setor - Um breve relato sobre an experiência em Quatinga Velho. Mimeo, ReCivitas
Neto, Pedro T. dos Santos. Relatório semestral da Renda Básica. ReCivitas, 2009.
Rudolph, Mathias. Nachhaltige Entwicklung von Quatinga Velho (Brasilien). Leuphana Universität Lüneburg, 2010.
Pereira, Bruna; Brancaglione, Marcus. Analytical report of three years of pilot-project of basic income guarantee in Quatinga Velho . ReCivitas, 2012.
Brancaglione, Marcus. Renda Básica Libertária. O verdadeiro dízimo. Clube de Autores, 2014.
Brancaglione, Marcus. Lições da Renda Básica em Quatinga Velho. Ou o que se aprende quando não se pede nada em troca. Clube de Autores, 2014.
 Brancaglione, Marcus. Lessons From The Practice Of Basic Income. Clube de Autores, 2015.
 Brancaglione, Marcus. Renda Básica Universal. Clube de Autores, 2016.
Brancaglione, Marcus. Basic Income Startup. Clube de Autores, 2017.

References

External links
 Recivitas.org

Universal basic income in Brazil
Non-profit organisations based in Brazil